The  is a nonprofit organization in Tokyo, Japan.  It indexes chemical information and translates abstracts between Japanese and English.  It works in collaboration with the Chemical Abstracts Service (CAS) in Columbus, Ohio.

JAICI was founded with the help of Hideaki Chihara in 1971.  It succeeded an earlier organization, the Japanese CA Abstractors' Association, which was started in 1954.

References

External links

 JAICI homepage (English language)

Chemistry societies